Zenochloris freyi is a species of beetle in the family Cerambycidae. It was described by Ernst Fuchs in 1966.

References

Trachyderini
Beetles described in 1966